Carbury Castle is a castle situated in the townland of Carbury, on the borders of Kildare and Offaly

Carbury Castle was built in the 13th century by Pierce St. Leger. Carbury is called after Cairbre son of Niall of the Nine Hostages. The chieftain is supposed to have entertained St. Patrick but instead of serving up a lamb or venison or other suitable roast he served up a greyhound on a dish. This was done out of disrespect for St. Patrick. The Saint, however, before commencing to dine blessed the food and immediately the greyhound came back to life and walked off the table and out the door. Carbury was married to Boinne after whom the Boyne is called. The Boyne rises in the grounds of Newberry Hall now owned by Mr Robinson. Near the source of the Boyne is a Holy Well called Trinity Well, the water of which is supposed to cure Tooth Aches. The Bermingham's occupied the Castle for 200(?) years after which it passed to the Collies or Cowleys' ancestors of Wellesleys.

History
The Castle was first built by the Normans and the motte on the hill was probably built by Meiler FitzHenry. The central scenic focus of Carbury Hill is the ruins of the Tudor mansion of the Colleys, which was also known as Fairy Hill.  who was granted the area by Strongbow. It was acquired by the de Berminghams in the 14th century, from whom it passed by inheritance  to the Preston family, who held the title  Baron Gormanston,  before being taken by the native Irish in the 15th century. The 1st Earl of Shrewsbury, John Talbot, later also Earl of Wexford, Earl of Waterford and Baron of Dungarvan, rebuilt Carbury Castle sometime after 1429–1447.

From 23 October 1554 a 21-year lease was granted to Sir Henry Colley (the patrilineal ancestor of the Dukes of Wellington); this was renewed, and the Colley family built a large stronghouse on the hilltop in the 17th century, now a ruin.

References 

Castles in County Kildare